The MV Andrew J. Barberi is one of two Barberi-class ferry boats operated as part of the Staten Island Ferry between Manhattan and Staten Island in New York City, besides MV Samuel I. Newhouse. With a capacity of 6,000, she is among the highest-capacity boats in the ferry's fleet. Since her introduction in 1981, she has had a history of incidents, including a 2003 crash that killed eleven people and a 2010 crash that injured thirty-seven.

Andrew J. Barberi was named after the longtime coach of Curtis High School's football team, who had died shortly before the ship was commissioned. Barberi coached throughout the 1950s, '60s and '70s and was instrumental in the development of scholastic football on Staten Island.

2003 accident

On October 15, 2003, Andrew J. Barberi was involved in a fatal accident. Eleven people died, including one decapitation, and 70 more were injured (including one man who lost his legs), as a result of Andrew J. Barberi colliding with a pier on Staten Island.

On March 8, 2005, the National Transportation Safety Board (NTSB) published a report on its investigation into the incident. The NTSB determined the probable cause of the collision was the assistant pilot's sudden incapacitation due to unreported and illegal use of prescription medications for chronic pain, high blood pressure and insomnia (none of these conditions had been reported to the Coast Guard as required by law), with a contributory cause of the Master's failure to maintain command and control of his vessel. 60 Minutes uncovered that the assistant pilot was short on sleep when he crashed the boat. However the NTSB determined the side-effects of the medications he was under were the most likely contributors.

The assistant pilot tried to commit suicide after the crash and admitted he had passed out on painkillers in the boat's pilothouse. He later pleaded guilty to 11 counts of seaman's manslaughter and falsifying his medical forms and was sentenced to 18 months in prison. The ferry director also pleaded guilty after failing to enforce a rule requiring that ferries be operated by two pilots and was sentenced to a year and a day in prison. Because the doctor who certified him fit for duty was also the doctor who prescribed him the medications in the first place the doctor was also charged with accessory to Seaman's Manslaughter and given a 12 month good behaviour bond and removal from the Coast Guard list of doctors authorised to sign their medical forms.

Andrew J. Barberi was rebuilt in West Brighton, Staten Island by Caddell Dry Dock & Repair Co. and a bit over 8 months after the accident, on July 1, 2004, returned to regular service.

2010 accident

Incident

At approximately 9:00 a.m. on May 8, 2010, Andrew J. Barberi left Manhattan on her regularly scheduled crossing to the Staten Island terminal. The weather was calm with light winds, good visibility, and an ebbing tide. Aboard the vessel were 244 passengers, 18 crewmembers, 2 NYPD officers, and 2 concessionaires. As per standard procedure, both the captain and assistant captain were present in the Staten Island-end pilothouse. At 9:16, as Andrew J. Barberi was passing the Kill Van Kull buoy, the assistant captain began to reduce engine rpm and pitch in preparation for docking. The vessel initially responded as commanded, with AIS data indicating that the vessel had reduced speed slightly. Because Andrew J. Barberi was not equipped with a voyage data recorder at the time of the collision, it is impossible to determine exactly when the vessel failed to respond to the assistant captain's commands.

When Andrew J. Barberi was approximately halfway between the KVK buoy and the Staten Island terminal, the captain asked the assistant captain to reduce speed. The assistant captain replied affirmatively and began to input reduced Pitch commands. As the vessel rapidly approached the slip, the captain ordered the assistant captain to input a full reverse pitch command. The assistant captain complied and input the ordered pitch command. At the same time, the captain increased engine rpm in order to produce more astern thrust. At this moment the assistant captain became aware that the propulsion units were not following his commands, so he repeatedly pushed the control levels downward to repeat his astern command.

In the engine control room, the chief engineer began to notice that the sounds of the engines were not normal for this stage of the voyage. By watching a television mounted in the control room, an oiler became aware of the impending collision and notified the chief engineer. The chief engineer then ordered the engineering crew members to brace themselves for the collision. Up in the pilothouse, the Captain began to sound the whistle and issue the danger signal. The mate issued a brace command over the vessel's public address system and deckhands began to move passengers away from the vessel's bow. At 09:18:33, Andrew J. Barberi forcefully collided with the terminal.

As the collision occurred, many passengers who had not braced for impact were thrown to the floor. Eyewitness accounts of the incident mention that some passengers were thrown against glass doors and windows while others appeared to be thrown into the air by the force of the collision. Some passengers appeared to be emotionally disturbed by the incident and were observed weeping after the collision. Because the terminal's shore side transition bridge was free-floating, it is believed that the bridge absorbed some of the collision's energy. As a result of the impact, the transition bridge was lifted to a high of 5 feet above Andrew J. Barberi’s main deck and shifted back into a security fence. In the terminal, passengers waiting to embark described the collision as earthquake-like, shaking the entire building. Some passengers in the terminal began to run, fearing the vessel would break through the building. Once the vessel came to rest, the assistant captain input a no-pitch, or neutral, command into the propulsion units.

After the impact, one of the two NYPD officers on board the ferry radioed for assistance. Upon receiving the officer's call, the NYPD's Ferry Security Division began to mobilize police resources to the scene of the collision. The NYPD also notified the USCG and FDNY. FDNY arrived approximately seven minutes later and began to administer first aid and search for any passengers who may have been thrown overboard by the collision. Around 40 passengers were taken to a local hospital for a variety of injuries. The remaining passengers disembarked via a gangway that had been placed between the vessel's main deck and the displaced transition bridge. Below deck, the vessel's engineers began to check the vessel for damage. The only damage was found above the waterline of the Staten Island end of the vessel.

Cause

The initial discovery of the problem with the vessel's propulsion system occurred when the Barberi's chief engineer went up to the pilothouse after the collision. The engineer found that even though the pitch levers were in the neutral position, the propeller pitch indicator for the New York-end unit read out 50% thrust. This indication was confirmed by the stream of water that was being pushed away from the stern of the vessel. The chief engineer then unsuccessfully attempted to bring the propulsion unit to zero pitch using the pilothouse controls. Control of the propulsion units was transferred to the engine room, where the crew used the units’ local controls to bring the pitch to zero. When the crew later attempted to back the Barberi out of the terminal using these local controls, both propulsion units functioned normally.

On May 10, 2010, NTSB inspectors attempted to replicate the problem with the pilothouse controls. Because the vessel was docked during the testing, the units were tested without the engines running. Hydraulic pressure to the units was supplied by electric standby pumps, which limited the maximum attainable pitch command to 75%. When a full ahead pitch command was input from either pilothouse, both units responded normally. When a neutral pitch command was then input, the Staten Island end propulsion unit responded normally to the command, while the New York end unit remained locked at 75% thrust. When control was subsequently transferred to the engine room, both propulsion units responded normally to commands.

The investigators then turned their attention to the New York-end's propulsion control panel. In this panel, electric solenoids were used to shift hydraulic valves. These valves sent hydraulic oil to the control cylinders on the propulsion units, shifting the pitch setting of the units. The panel was removed from the vessel and sent to the NTSB's material laboratory. Upon disassembling the ahead/astern solenoids on the panel, investigators found bronze ring fragments. These ring fragments had lodged themselves in the solenoids, preventing their correct operation. Due to the nature of the damage that the rings had sustained, NTSB investigators were unable to determine why they had originally fractured.

References

External links
Staten Island current ferry fleet, including tab for Ferryboat Andrew J. Barberi

Staten Island Ferry vessels
1981 ships
Maritime incidents in 2010
Ships built in New Orleans
Maritime incidents in 2003